General Charun Rattanakun Seriroengrit (Luang Seriroengrit) (October 27, 1895 –  July 19, 1983) was a Thai army officer, civil servant and politician. He was a general of the Phayap Army in the government of Plaek Phibunsongkhram in World War II.

Careers 
In the days of absolute monarchy, the captain Charun Rattanakun got the feudal title of honor Luang Seriroengrit awarded. He joined the Khana Ratsadon, which means a Coup d'état in 1932 ended the absolute monarchy and replaced Thailand with a constitutional monarchy.

Seriroengrit meantime became colonel, took off in 1938 an important position in the government of Plaek Phibunsongkhram. He became head of the State Railway of Thailand.,

After the end of Franco-Thai War, he was promoted to Lieutenant general in February 1942 and moved to the head of Phayap Army (Northeast Army). He was involved to the Burma Campaign and held in the connection part of the occupation of Shan State.

Family 
A son from his marriage with Eop Komalavardhana was Colonel . Colonel Aram married Princess Galyani Vadhana in 1944; their daughter is Thanpuying Dhasanawalaya Sornsongkram.

References

Charun Rattanakun Seriroengrit
Charun Rattanakun Seriroengrit
Seriroengrit, Charun Rattanakun
Seriroengrit, Charun Rattanakun
Charun Rattanakun Seriroengrit
Charun Rattanakun Seriroengrit
Charun Rattanakun Seriroengrit
Charun Rattanakun Seriroengrit
Charun Rattanakun Seriroengrit
Charun Rattanakun Seriroengrit
Charun Rattanakun Seriroengrit
Charun Rattanakun Seriroengrit
Charun Rattanakun Seriroengrit
Charun Rattanakun Seriroengrit
Charun Rattanakun Seriroengrit